Petroleum, natural gas, and coal are exported from various source countries to countries reliant on these fossil fuels.

Petroleum

This is a list of countries by oil exports  mostly based on The World Factbook:

Natural gas

This is a list of countries by natural gas exports  mostly based on The World Factbook:

Coal

This is a list of countries by coal exports  mostly based on US Energy Information Administration:

References

Energy-related lists
Fossil fuels
Export